Parallel card could mean:

 An insert card mostly identical to another card in the same trading card series
 Parallel port expansion card in a computer